The Le Moyne River generally flows south, on the north shore of the St. Lawrence River, in the municipality of Château-Richer, in the La Côte-de-Beaupré Regional County Municipality in the administrative region of Capitale-Nationale, in the province of Quebec, in Canada.

The lower part of this small valley is served by avenue Royale (route 360) and route 138 which runs along the north shore of St. Lawrence River. The Chemin de la Mine, the Montée des Hirondelles and the Montée des Chênes serve the intermediate part to the foot of the moraine. The upper part has mountainous relief and some secondary forest roads, including Chemin Beauséjour, are accessible. Forestry is the main economic activity in this valley; agriculture (lower part) second.

The surface of the Le Moyne River is generally frozen from the beginning of December until the end of March; however, safe traffic on the ice is generally from mid-December to mid-March. The water level of the river varies with the seasons and the precipitation; the spring flood occurs in March or April.

Geography 
The Le Moyne river begins at the confluence of two streams in the mountains behind the Côte-de-Beaupré, in Château-Richer.

 towards the south-east in the forest zone, up to a bend of the river corresponding to a stream (coming from the north);
 south on the Laurentian plateau, to a stream (coming from the northwest);
 to the south-east in an agricultural zone passing under the high-voltage wires of Hydro-Québec, forming an S and passing between the village Laverdière (located on the north side) and the hamlet Le Moyne (located on the south side), to route 138;
  south-east in an agricultural zone to its mouth.

The Le Moyne River flows into Château-Richer into a small bay on the northwest shore of the St. Lawrence River. This bay faces the northern tip of Île d'Orléans which is  distant by the chenal de l'Île d'Orléans. This mouth is located between the hamlet Le Moyne (located on the south side) and the village of Laverdière.

Toponymy 
The name evokes the explorer Pierre LeMoyne d'Iberville.

The toponym "Rivière Lemoyne" was formalized on December 5, 1968 at the Place Names Bank of the Commission de toponymie du Québec.

See also 

 Chenal de l'Île d'Orléans
 Château-Richer, a municipality
 La Côte-de-Beaupré Regional County Municipality
 Capitale-Nationale, an administrative region
 St. Lawrence River
 List of rivers of Quebec

Notes and references 

Rivers of Capitale-Nationale
La Côte-de-Beaupré Regional County Municipality